Marie-Claude Audet (born 20 January 1962) is a Canadian former cyclist. She competed in the women's road race event at the 1984 Summer Olympics.

References

External links
 

1962 births
Living people
Canadian female cyclists
Olympic cyclists of Canada
Cyclists at the 1984 Summer Olympics
People from Abitibi-Témiscamingue